Il sogno di un giorno is a 1916 Italian film directed by Augusto Genina.

External links 
 

1916 films
Italian silent films
Films directed by Augusto Genina
Italian black-and-white films